Faizul Amri bin Adnan is a Malaysian politician from PKR. He was the Member of Johor State Legislative Assembly for Serom from 2018 to 2022.

Politics 
On 22 June 2020, he tendered his resignation as Amanah’s state committee member and its education committee chairman and stated that he was not interested in defending his Serom seat. On 27 February 2021, he joined PKR and expressed his intention to contest for a parliamentary seat.

Election results

References 

People's Justice Party (Malaysia) politicians
Malaysian people of Malay descent
Living people
1973 births